Wilhelmsdorf is a town in the district of Ravensburg in Baden-Württemberg in Germany.

The place was founded in 1824 by Pietists, who wanted to emigrate overseas, but were granted by King William I of Württemberg a place, where they could settle among themselves. The place was named after the king and modelled after the settlement congregations of the Herrnhuter Bruedergemeine or Moravian Church.

References 

Ravensburg (district)
Württemberg